Windom College (previous names, Western Minnesota Seminary and Windom Institute) is a former American parochial school in Montevideo, Minnesota. It is the second school established in southwestern Minnesota by the Congregational church. It was founded in 1885 with the hope that its students would  take more advanced courses in Carleton  College. Originally named "Western Minnesota Seminary", it became the "Windom Institute" in 1891 in honor of Hon. William Windom, United States  Senator and Secretary of the Treasury, who was a member of the Congregational church in Winona, Minnesota, the  earliest of the Congregational churches in southeastern  Minnesota. The name change in 1912 to "Windom College" gave western Minnesota its first college. Windom College ended operations in 1923. Its building was purchased by and became the official home of the Masons of Montevideo.

Location
Windom College was located in Montevideo in the western part of Minnesota. The students came largely from a Scandinavian and American population.

The large campus of  afforded opportunities for outdoor sports, such as tennis, baseball, football, boating, fishing, and during the winter months, skating, coasting, and skiing.

Background
In 1884, President Strong of Carleton College  suggested  at  a  meeting of  the  State  Association  of  Congregational  Churches,  the  necessity of  Academies  or  Fitting  Schools  in  different  sections  of  Minnesota.

To create a new standard of culture for western Minnesota, and to link such an effort to the inspiring forces of religion, was  the thought in the minds of those who founded the Western  Minnesota Seminary in 1885. A corporation of 26 members, with  provision as to its relation to the churches and to Carleton  College, was organized to carry out the plans for this enterprise, and steps were taken for the raising of funds. C. A. Strong was the first to pledge .

Western Minnesota Seminary, 1885
In the fall of 1885,  the  school  was  opened with three boys and one girl. An old hotel on the hill was secured and fitted up as well as the poverty  of the school's treasury  allowed. The office and parlor were recitation rooms,  the  dining  room, an assembly  hall, while a little dingy  back room served as an art and music department. James Fairchild,  of Oberlin College and Harvard University, was  the  principal, a man who inherited from his father, George Fairchild, an integrity and ability that were of great importance in this formative period of  the  school.  Miss Julia V. Finney, from Carleton College, brought to the school exceptional teaching ability and a sympathy with its purposes which gave  her patience under trying circumstances. Miss Lizzie Cady, of Oberlin, had charge of the musical  instruction. Miss Minnie  Bailey, from Carleton undertook art instruction in the school and village. Their salaries were small and often months behind.

In one of the school's most dire financial periods, Judge Edwin Smith Jones, of Minneapolis, came to Montevideo to investigate for himself. He assured the school's administration "... that the school is not going to give up, it is going to succeed, and you tell them that I say so." From that day, Judge Jones gave of his time and money to supplement the administration's other efforts.

In September 1888,  the  State  Association  of  Congregational churches  met  at  Owatonna, Minnesota. Carleton  College  waived  its  right  to  time  while Pres. Strong  and  Prof. Goodhue  made  effective  pleas  for  Montevideo. Messrs.

About  1890, new  forces  began  to  enter  into  the  making  of  the  school.  One  of  the most  important  of  these  was  the  coming  of  Charles  W.  Headley,  with his  wife,  to  the  principalship  of  the  school.  Educated  in Ripon College  and  Yale Divinity School,  Principal  Headley  brought  to  the school  a type  of  force which  left  its  impress  upon  the  character  of the  graduates  for  the  next  decade. Headley  stood  through  storm  and stress,  and  only  resigned  on  the  return  of  harmonious  and  prosperous days.  For  this  invaluable  service  he  is  always  honored  among us.

Windom Institute, 1891
The document contained  the names  of  eight  governors. The  dedication  of  Jones  Hall  in  that same year  brought  to  Montevideo the  highest  officials  of  the  state  and notable men in  business  and  educational  circles.

During  these  years  the  school  was  fortunate  in  interesting  Mr. W. S. Benton,  of  Minneapolis,  in  its  future. After the death of Mr. 
Benton, his widow proved to be generous to Windom Institute as well.

Marion LeRoy Burton and his wife came to the school in 1900 and by their broad and deep interest, became the school's leaders. Miss Hannah M. Griffith, of Carleton and Wellesley College training, filled the position of  preceptress-teacher. Harry S. Martin served as  principal of the Institute in 1904-6, with Mrs. Martin. Rev. Frank King Singiser was the principal in 1907-09, with his wife as preceptress. Ralph Edwin Nichol was principal in 1910 and 1911. For many years, Nellie Moyer Budd served as head of the music department.

Windom College, 1912
Calvin E. Buswell served as principal in 1912. The  trustees  rightly  felt that  the  opportunities  for  the  development  of  a  great  school  in  this vast  agricultural  territory  ought  not  to  be  neglected,  there  being  no other  school  of  the  class  nearer  than  Minneapolis or Northfield, Minnesota. To support  such  a  school,  it  became  necessary  to  enlarge  the  endowment fund. The  people  of  Montevideo  and  the  surrounding region responded  liberally  to  the  call  for  financial  aid. May 15, 1915 was  set  as  the  time  for  completing  the  endowment. 

From 1913 to 1918  was the  presidency of Rev. John  H. Morley, who  had  been  the  president  of  Fargo College in 1900-1906. Lycurgus Rose Moyer, of  Montevideo, was treasurer of Windom College from  1896 until his death in 1917.

Fire of 1915
On  Friday  evening,  January  25,  1915,  fire  started  in  the  roof  of Jones  Hall.  The  hydrant  near  the  building  was  frozen,  and  the  water power  was  insufficient  to  raise  any  considerable  stream  of  water  to that  elevation.  Owing to insufficient water pressure it was impossible to use the standpipe and hose in the building which were always kept ready for emergencies. The flames spread so rapidly that there was a loss of nearly everything on the upper floors.

There was  insurance.

The new Jones Hall was erected in the summer of 1915, the whole building cemented in gray. Ample accommodations for recitation rooms was furnished, and the laboratory was better equipped for work than previously. There were also practice rooms for music, which had been lacking. In all, in this modern three-story and basement building with its facilities for laboratory, musical and recitation purposes there was little to remind anyone of the old building except the tablet dedicated to Hon. Mr. Jones, which was placed in a conspicuous place in the entrance, for the new building, like the old, was named Jones Hall.

The trustees wanted to erect a  ladies' dormitory as soon as funds were in hand for this purpose. Mr. Hill promised  of this. The endowment campaign was temporarily stayed because of the fire. Mr. Hill extended the time for its completion one year.

Closure
For  the  outlook  of  this  College  at  the  beginning  of  the school  year  1920-21,  we  may  quote  its  announcement  by  the Montevideo  News,  September  30,  1920:— "The  fall  term  at  Windom  opened  Tuesday  with  a  promising  enrollment of  new  students. A  teaching  staff  of  seven  members  has  been secured  for  the  various  departments. All  of  the  members  of  this year's  faculty  are  graduates  of  standard  colleges  and  they  come strongly  endorsed. R.  G.  Walker,  a  graduate  of  the  University of Nebraska,  is  a  new member  of  the  faculty,  in  charge  of  courses  in  bookkeeping,  banking, and  allied  subjects. John  R.  Rowe,  Beloit  College,  will  act  as principal  and  also  teach  classes  in  mathematics  and  science. Miss Alice  Roosevelt,  Grinnell  College,  is  again  at  the  head  of  the  music department,  and  will  also  teach  languages. Mrs.  Bayard  Taylor, Beloit College,  is  preceptress  and  teacher  of  history  and  civics. New  equipment  for  the  business  courses  has  been  installed  during the  summer. Among  the  modern  appliances  available  for  the  use  of students  are  dictaphones,  a  bank  posting  machine,  and  an  electric mimeograph."

Windom College ended operations in 1923, and the Masons moved into the school's building in February, when it became the official home of the Masons of Montevideo.

References

1885 establishments in Minnesota
1923 disestablishments in Minnesota
Windom, Minnesota
Defunct schools in Minnesota
Congregational churches in Minnesota
Defunct private schools in the United States
Defunct private universities and colleges in Minnesota